Frederick Municipal Airport  is a public airport located in the city of Frederick, in Frederick County, Maryland, United States. This airport is publicly owned by the City of Frederick.

Frederick Municipal Airport (FDK) is classified as a general aviation airport. According to analysis, FDK experienced approximately 129,000 operations in 2004 with an expected increase to about 165,000 by 2025.

Facilities 
In October 2010, Frederick Municipal Airport received $4.8 million from the American Recovery and Reinvestment Act of 2009 to build and staff a control tower at the airport. Work commenced in October 2010, and an air traffic control tower, with accompanying Class D airspace, was commissioned on May 1, 2012.

Runways 
FDK maintains two paved runways: the primary runway, Runway 5-23, which is 5,220 feet in length and 100 feet in width, and Runway 12-30, which is 3,600 feet in length and 75 feet in width.

Plans for the airfield include upgrading the existing runway 5/23 to 6,000 feet in length, 12/30 to 3,750 feet, and adding a third turf runway with 2,400 feet. In keeping up with increased growth of corporate and personal aircraft in the Frederick area, the airport has also planned for increased hangar storage.

 Runway 5/23:  , surface: asphalt concrete
 Runway 12/30: , surface: asphalt concrete

On field 

 Aircraft Owners and Pilots Association (AOPA) headquarters
 Fuel: 100LL, Jet-A
 Aircraft sales
 Aircraft maintenance
 Oxygen
 Pilot lounge and supplies
 Airways Inn restaurant
 Frederick Flight Center (flight training and rental)
 Bravo Flight Training (Flight Training and Rental)
 Helicopter Flight school and rental

In popular culture
The Frederick Municipal Airport, called Frederick Field in the movie, is featured in the 1996 action film Executive Decision starring Kurt Russell, though the airport filmed is not Frederick Municipal Airport but rather Van Nuys Airport.

History
Frederick Municipal Airport's construction began on March 26, 1946. It replaced Detrick Field, which would become Fort Detrick and lose its aeronautical function. The airport opened on April 17, 1946, with the arrival of a Stinson aircraft, although the airport was not open for general use until the grading and paving of the runways completed later. The airport was dedicated on May 1, 1949. At the dedication ceremony, two plaques were unveiled; one honored Frederick County residents who served their country in World War II, and the other honored Lieutenant William T. Delaplaine III, the first Frederick County pilot to lose their life in World War II.

The airport became the home of the Experimental Aircraft Association east coast fly-in in 1970.

References

External links 

Airport/Facility Directory published by FAA every 56 days
US Terminal Procedures published by FAA every 56 days
Flight Guide published by Airguide Publications, Inc. semiannually

Airports in Maryland
Transportation buildings and structures in Frederick County, Maryland
Buildings and structures in Frederick, Maryland